Camper Vantiquities is a 1993 rarities compilation album by musical group Camper Van Beethoven, released on I.R.S.  It included the earlier EP Vampire Can Mating Oven and a number of other unreleased tracks, compiled by bassist Victor Krummenacher a few years after the band split up.  The 2004 re-release added several more tracks, all demo versions of songs that appeared on the band's two Virgin Records albums.

Track listing

Original 1993 version
"Heart" (David Lowery) - 3:08
"Never Go Back" (Victor Krummenacher, Greg Lisher, Lowery, Chris Pedersen, Jonathan Segel) - 3:24
"Seven Languages" (Krummenacher, Lisher, Lowery, Pedersen, Segel) - 4:12
"Axe Murderer Song" (Lowery) - 2:28
"SP37957" (Krummenacher, Lowery, Jonathan Segel) - 3:04
"Crossing Over" (Krummenacher, Lowery, Chris Molla, Segel) - 3:24
"Guardian Angels" (Lowery, Molla) - 2:06
"I'm Not Like Everybody Else" (Ray Davies) - 3:24
"AC Cover" (Krummenacher, Lisher, Lowery, Pedersen, Segel) - 3:01
"Porpoise Mouth" (Joe McDonald) - 2:38
"(We Workers Do Not Understand) Modern Art" (Krummenacher, Lisher, Lowery, Pedersen, Segel) - 2:58
"We Eat Your Children" (Krummenacher, Lisher, Lowery, Pedersen, Segel) - 3:49
"Six More Miles to the Graveyard" (Hank Williams) - 2:57
"Ice Cream Everyday" (Box O' Laffs, Curkendall, Hart, Lowery, Molla) - 4:04
"Processional" (Krummenacher, Lisher, Lowery, Pedersen, Segel) - 3:48
"Photograph" (George Harrison, Ringo Starr) - 3:14
"Om Eye (Sweet Isthmus)" - 2:06 [hidden track]

2004 CD reissue
"Heart" - 3:07
"Never Go Back" - 3:24
"Seven Languages" - 4:12
"Axe Murderer Song" - 2:28
"SP37957" - 3:04
"Crossing Over" - 3:24
"Guardian Angels" - 2:06
"I'm Not Like Everybody Else" - 3:24
"AC Cover" - 3:01
"Flowers (Fox Demo)" - 3:03
"One of These Days (Fox Demo)" - 3:27
"Humid Press of Days (Fox Demo)" - 2:55
"All Her Favourite Fruit (Fox Demo)" - 5:14
"Silent Monster" - 2:54
"Porpoise Mouth" - 2:38
"(We Workers Do Not Understand) Modern Art" - 2:58
"We Eat Your Children" - 3:49
"Six More Miles to the Graveyard" - 2:57
"Ice Cream Everyday" - 4:04
"Processional" - 3:48
"Photograph" - 3:33

Personnel 

Anthony Guess – Drums
Victor Krummenacher – Bass
Greg Lisher – Guitar
David Lowery – Guitar (Rhythm), Vocals
Chris Molla – Guitar, Mandolin
Chris Pedersen – Guitar, Violin, Drums, Keyboards, Vocals (background)
Jonathan Segel – Guitar, Violin, Keyboards, Vocals

Camper Van Beethoven albums
1993 compilation albums
I.R.S. Records compilation albums